Kottas Christou or Kote Hristov (Bulgarian/Macedonian: Коте Христов), known simply as Kottas or Kote, and often referred to as Konstantinos Christou, was a Slavophone revolutionary chieftain in Western Macedonia during the Macedonian Struggle.

Kottas was born in the village of Roulia (Greek Ρούλια, Bulgarian/Macedonian Руля/Руља), in 1863, and was elder of Roulia from 1893 to 1896. He began anti-Ottoman rebel activity in 1898, killing four local Ottoman officers. He was first associated with the pro-Bulgarian Internal Macedonian Revolutionary Organization (IMRO). Afterwards he became associated with the pro-Greek irregular Hellenic Macedonian Committee. He was captured by the Ottomans, convicted of robbery and hanged in Monastir in 1905.

Background
 
Though a Slavophone, who only spoke Bulgarian, Kottas had a Greek identity. He was initially a member of the Internal Macedonian Revolutionary Organization (IMRO) movement, but he felt deceived after he realized the real purposes of the Bulgarian-directed IMRO. However, according to the resident of Kastoria Georgi Raykov, Kotas was the initiator of his co-villagers renouncing the Greek Patriarchate and recognizing the Bulgarian Exarchate. Also, according to Raykov, Kotas attempted to kill the Greek Metropolitan Philaret, but the bishop found out and avoided the ambush.

Conflicts
Kottas was sentenced to death by IMRO twice for murders of their members. The IMRO also accused him under the pretense of theft. Kottas developed ties with the Greek bishop of Kastoria, Germanos Karavangelis, in order to organize his struggle against the IMRO. His mission was to kill IMRO leader (voivode) Lazar Poptraykov and other leaders in order to protect Greek civilians. Karavangelis funded his troops.<ref>Massacre and Barbarism at Zagorichane from  http://www.geocities.com/macedonian_world/ </ref> Gotse Delchev had repeatedly pardoned and vainly tried to reform Kottas before he was finally outlawed by the IMRO, after entering the service of the Greek bishop. At the time of the Ilinden Uprising (1903), when all old wrongs were forgiven in the name of the common struggle, Kottas was received back by the IMRO at the insistence of Lazar Poptraykov, the same voivode he set out to kill. During the uprising, Poptraykov had been wounded and taken refuge with Kottas, who used the opportunity to kill him and present his head to the Greeks. The Greek bishop was wary of him because of his native Slavic tongue and hatred of Turks. His behavior toward the Ottomans was an obstruction to the Greek tactic, as it was often necessary to cooperate with the Ottoman officers against the Bulgarian enemy (IMRO).

Kottas, a veteran klepht, kidnapped Petko Yanev, a Bulgarian seasonal worker recently returned from America, and tortured him and his family until he had extracted all the savings Yanev had brought. However, Yanev complained vigorously to the vali'' Hilmi Pasha himself, and to foreign consuls. The British consul pressed Hilmi Pasha to act, and eventually, Kottas was arrested by the Ottomans.

He was executed by hanging in 1905 in Monastir. His last words before hanging, said in his native Lower Prespa dialect, were "Long live Greece!" The loss of Kottas was detrimental to the Greek movement. After his death, many volunteers from free Greece came to Macedonia to participate in the struggle, in addition to the locals.

Legacy

Kottas was married to Zoi Christou (née Sfektou), and together they had 8 children; Sofia Christou, Dimitrios Christou, Sotirios Christou, Vasiliki Christou, Christos Christou, Lazaros Christou, Paschalini Christou and Evangelos Christou.

Kottas still has surviving descendants in Greece.

The village he was born, now in the Florina regional unit, has been renamed Kottas in his honour.

There is a bust of him in the village of his birth.

There is a street named after him in Kastoria.

He is memorialized in the Captain Kottas Museum, which was built at the site of his birth.

Kottas is known for saying, "The difficult part is to kill the bear first, and then, it is easy to share the skin."

He is revered as a national hero in Greece, and considered a Bulgarophone Greek and the first fighter in the Greek Struggle for Macedonia, while he is considered a predatory warlord by Slavic Macedonians and a renegade Grecoman in Bulgaria. Kottas' objectives are not easily identifiable by contemporary historians. It seems that his chief goal was the rejection of Ottoman rule. From the beginnings of his insurgent action, without having a Greek or Bulgarian consciousness, he had formed the outlook of a Christian chieftain antagonizing Ottoman rule, whom IMRO was forced to coopt. After his distancing from the IMRO and the Exarchists -when they turned against other Christians-, his accession to the patriarchist camp and his recruitment in the Greek cause, his stance was characterized by fluidity, as he maintained relations with his former comrades, balancing between the two camps, but constantly opposed to Ottoman rule, contrary to Karavangelis.

Gallery

References

Sources

 
 
 

1863 births
1905 deaths
19th-century Greek people
20th-century executions by the Ottoman Empire
Eastern Orthodox Christians from Greece
Executed Greek people
Greek people of the Macedonian Struggle
Greeks from the Ottoman Empire
Macedonian revolutionaries (Greek)
Macedonia under the Ottoman Empire
People executed by the Ottoman Empire by hanging
Slavic speakers of Greek Macedonia
People from Florina (regional unit)
Greek people from the Ottoman Empire